Erkan Kolçak Köstendil (born 16 January 1983) is a Turkish actor and director. He started his career with roles in theater plays, films, and TV series, however, he eventually became known with his role in Ulan Istanbul and later in Çukur. He played supporting roles in hit series Yılan Hikayesi, Kurtlar Vadisi, Sakarya Fırat, Merhamet, "Muhteşem Yüzyıl: Kösem". He has won awards for his appearance in several short films.

Life and career 
Köstendil was born in 1983 in Bursa. He is a graduate of Bursa Atatürk High School. During his high school years, he was a member of the Bursaspor football team.

He began his acting career at the Tuncay Özinel Theater, by playing a number of roles in plays such as AuT and Karşı Cinsle Tanışma Sanatı.

In 2009, he wrote and directed the series Mukadderat, which was published online on Facebook. In the same year, he got a role in the action series M.A.T and portrayed the character of "Emre". In 2010, he wrote and directed the short movie Vakit, which received awards at the Sinepark 4th Short Film Festival, Eskişehir Kral Midas Short Film Festival, and the 47th International Antalya Film Festival.

He also wrote the scenario for the feature film Torbacının Esrarı, which was shot in Amsterdam and Istanbul. His fourth short film project was Suma, which was released in 2018 and realized as one of Turkey's good comedy works at the Los Angeles Film Awards.

Theater 
 Kalp Düğümü – Craft Theater
 AuT – İkincikat Theater
 Karşı Cinsle Tanışma Sanatı – Isparta Virtual Theater

Filmography

Web series

Television series

Film

Discography 
Singles
 2018: "Nemrudun kızı"
 2020: "Doyana Doymayana Popkek III"

References

External links 
 

Living people
1983 births
Turkish male stage actors
Turkish male film actors
Turkish male television actors